Among the awards and nominations received by the Malaysian singer-songwriter Shila Amzah are: first runner-up of Bintang Kecil RTM in 2000, first runner-up of One in a Million (season 2), winner of Asia New Singer Competition in 2008, second runner-up of I Am a Singer (season 2) in 2014, and first runner-up of Anugerah Juara Lagu in 2011 and 2015. In 2013, Shila was the first Malay and Malaysian artist to be nominated at the World Music Awards after winning Asian Wave. Shila is the first and only Malay artist to be invited to the Global Chinese Music Awards (GCMA).

Malaysia

Anugerah Bintang Popular Berita Harian
Anugerah Bintang Popular (Malay: Popular Star Award),  commonly known by the acronym ABPBH, originally named as Anugerah Pelakon/Penyanyi Popular, is an award presented annually by Berita Harian of Malaysia to recognize excellence of professionals in the entertainment industry, including the film industry, as well as record industry. The award ceremony features performances by prominent artists. It is the most prestigious people's choice award for Malaysian artists in the entertainment industry. The award was established in 1987 and it is totally based from the votes submitted by the readers of Berita Harian.

Anugerah Industri Muzik
Anugerah Industri Muzik (Malay: Music Industry Award),  commonly known by the acronym AIM, is the Record Industry of Malaysia award ceremony.

It is Malaysia's equivalent of the Grammy Awards.

Anugerah Juara Lagu
Anugerah Juara Lagu (AJL, Malay for "Champion of Songs Awards") is a popular annual music competition in Malaysia, organized by TV3 since 1986. It features the best musical and lyrical compositions of each year it is held. Nominees are derived from a list of mostly-Malay songs which have garnered the most public votes in Muzik Muzik throughout the year, and then progress into the semi-finals, from which twelve songs – four songs from each of three categories (Pop/Rock, Balada, and Irama Malaysia – later known as Etnik Kreatif) will be nominated by a panel of judges to enter the Juara Lagu.

AJL honours the composers and lyricists of the songs rather than the performing artistes.

Shout! Awards
The Shout! Awards is an entertainment award show created to celebrate the Malaysian entertainment scene which is said has rapidly developed. The award recognizes people of music, television, film and radio industry as well as the entertainment industry as a whole.

There are 16 award categories including the biggest title – The Ultimate Shout! Award. The nominees are voted by the public online except for the Ultimate Shout! Award where it is decided by the judges.

Bella Awards
Malaysia’s 1st women awards show – Bella Awards 2013 – to celebrate, recognize, and honor successful women for their great achievement and inspirational contribution to the society.

The idea of the awards show derived from ntv7's award-winning women talk show – Bella – a show which inspires women every day with its powerful and informative topics.

Supported and endorsed by the Ministry of Women, Family and Community Development, the inaugural Bella Awards was debuted on 2 March 2013, in-conjunction with International Women's Day. The awards show will air LIVE at prime time 9 pm – 10.30 pm, while the Red Carpet will be shown at 8.30 pm, only on ntv7.

The BrandLaureate Awards
The BrandLaureate Awards is The Grammy Awards for Branding. This awards was founded by The Asia Pacific Brands Foundation (APBF), which is a non-profit organization dedicated to the promotion and improvement of branding standards in Malaysia and the Asia Pacific.

The BrandLaureate is the sobriquet for the APBF Brand Excellence Awards. As the definition of "laureate" is one that is worthy of the greatest honor or distinction, being conferred The BrandLaureate Awards is a defining moment as it is a testimony of the brand's success and an endorsement of being with the best and an acknowledgement of the brand's value, strength and character.

The BrandLaureate Awards is the ONLY Brand Award endorsed by His Royal Highness Duli Yang Maha Mulia Yang di-Pertuan Agong, Tuanku Mizan Zainal Abidin.

Singapore and Indonesia

Anugerah Planet Muzik
Anugerah Planet Muzik is the award for artists who are engaged in the music world. This award includes singers from the allied countries, that is Malaysia, Singapore, and Indonesia.

The event was first held in 2001, and has been regularly held to date. Awards are given in various categories. There are awards aimed at covering all the countries that participate. And there are also awards intended for particular countries.

China

Asian Wave
Asian Wave is a Chinese reality singing talent show featuring contestants from many different Asian countries. The show premiered on 11 July 2012 on Dragon Television.

I Am A Singer 2
I Am a Singer is a Chinese version of the reality show I Am a Singer and it is broadcast on Hunan Television.

United States

Nickelodeon Kids' Choice Awards
The Nickelodeon Kids' Choice Awards, also known as the KCAs or Kids Choice Awards, is an annual awards show that airs on the Nickelodeon cable channel, which airs live and is usually held and telecast live (though with a three-hour time delay for those watching in the Pacific Time Zone or on the Nick 2 feed on digital cable that simulcasts the Pacific time zone feed) on a Saturday night in late March or early April, that honors the year's biggest television, movie, and music acts, as voted by Nickelodeon viewers.

But for Favourite Asian Act which Shila was nominated, only known as international distribution from Asia region.

World

World Music Awards
The World Music Awards is an international awards show founded in 1989 that annually honors recording artists based on worldwide sales figures provided by the International Federation of the Phonographic Industry (IFPI).

She was nominees in the World's Best Female Artist and World's Best Entertainer of The Year categories in World Music Awards 2012. However, the awards ceremony were postponed to Spring 2013, due to logistic and immigration issues. She was nominated again in 3 categories of World's Best Female Artist, World's Best Live Act and World's Best Entertainer of the Year in World Music Awards 2013.

Shila Amzah was nominated again in WMA 2014 in more categories added which is World's Best Songs & World's Best Video for her Masih Aku Cinta.

Global Chinese Music Awards
The Global Chinese Music Awards (GCMA) is a multi-national awards founded by seven Mandarin radio stations from Malaysia, Hong Kong, China, Singapore and Taiwan. In 2017, Shila Amzah became the only Malay singer for the award.

Forbes 30 Under 30 
Shila Amzah was listed in Forbes 30 Under 30 2018 along with a world most popular band BTS, Kris Wu, Pusarla V. Sindhu and many more artists and athletes  in the Entertainment and Sports category.

Accolades

References

Amzah, Shila
Awards